A marching band is a group consisting of instrumental musicians performing outdoors.

Marching band may also refer to:
"Marching Band" (Asian Kung-Fu Generation song), 2011
"Marching Band" (R. Kelly song), 2015
Marching Band (band), Swedish band